Pattonville High School is a public high school located in Maryland Heights, Missouri. It is the only high school in the Pattonville School District.

History
Pattonville High School's first graduating class was in 1937 with 2 girls graduating. In 1938, the graduating class had grown to 4 boys and 1 girl. The original high school was located behind Pattonville's learning center at 11055 St. Charles Rock Road but has since moved to its current location.

Achievement
As of 2020, the average ACT score is 21 and 90% of students graduate. 68% of graduating students go on to college after graduating, with 43% of graduates going to a 4-year University and 25% going to a 2-year Community College.

Curriculum 
All students are required to complete 50 hours of community service in order to receive a diploma. Students at PHS have the opportunity to participate in the Missouri A+ schools program, allowing 2 years of free tuition at any community college in the state of Missouri if grades and attendance requirements are met. PHS offers a variety of Honors and AP Classes that give college credit.

Demographics

Demographics as of 2020:

Activities
Students at Pattonville High School have the opportunity to participate in activities:
Pattonville fields a competitive marching band, and has had success at the national level in jazz band, jazz ensemble, cheerleading, and robotics.

Athletics
Pattonville High School offers various sports at freshman, junior varsity and varsity levels.

Boys Athletics
Baseball
Basketball
Cross Country
Football
Golf
Soccer
Swimming and Diving
Tennis
Track and Field
Volleyball
Water Polo (co-ed)
Wrestling
Girls Athletics
Basketball
Cross Country
Field Hockey
Golf
Lacrosse 
Soccer	
Softball
Swimming and Diving
Tennis
Track and Field
Volleyball
Water Polo (co-ed)
Wrestling

Notable alumni 
 Robert L. Behnken '88: NASA astronaut and mission specialist
 Scott Cooper '86: Major League Baseball player
 Lavell Crawford '86: Comedian, best known for his recurring role as Huell on AMC's Breaking Bad
 John Fulgham: Major League Baseball player
 Janet Jones: Actress
 Ken Jones: National Football League player
 Jeannie Kendall: Singer in the father/daughter Country music duo The Kendalls
 Gayle McCormick: Lead singer of Smith (band)
 Chuck McKinley: Wimbledon champion & 1963 Davis Cup winning professional tennis player
 Sue Meredith '84: 3 Term politician from Missouri Representative District 71
 Bryan Oelkers: Former MLB player (Minnesota Twins, Cleveland Indians)
 Blake Strode: Professional tennis player
 Kimberly Thompson: Professional Musician. Former Drummer of The 8G Band on Late Night with Seth Meyers
 Miguel Pérez '23: MLS player (still attending)

References 

High schools in St. Louis County, Missouri
Public high schools in Missouri
Buildings and structures in St. Louis County, Missouri
School buildings completed in 1933
1933 establishments in Missouri